Hatem Khamis Jamal Al-Hamhami (born 22 April 1994), commonly known as Hatem Al-Hamhami, is an Omani footballer who plays for Al-Suwaiq Club in Oman Professional League.

Club career

On 10 July 2014, he signed a two-year contract with Al-Nahda Club.

Club career statistics

International career
Hatem is part of the first team squad of the Oman national football team. He was selected for the national team for the first time in 2014. He made his first appearance for Oman on 25 December 2013 against Bahrain in the 2014 WAFF Championship. He has made appearances in the 2014 WAFF Championship.

International goals
Scores and results list Oman's goal tally first.

Honours

Club
With Al-Suwaiq
Oman Elite League (1): 2012–13
Sultan Qaboos Cup (1): 2012
Oman Super Cup (1): 2013; Runner-Up 2011

With Al-Nahda
Omani Super Cup (1): 2014

References

External links
 
 
 
 
 

1994 births
Living people
Omani footballers
Oman international footballers
Association football forwards
Suwaiq Club players
Al-Nahda Club (Oman) players
Oman Professional League players
Footballers at the 2014 Asian Games
Asian Games competitors for Oman